Niceair is a virtual airline headquartered in Akureyri in northern Iceland, with operations based at Akureyri Airport. The company launched services on 2 June 2022, using a leased Airbus A319.

History
In February 2022, Niceair was announced as a virtual airline with the intention of bringing tourists to northern Iceland from other parts of Europe, with services planned to launch on 2 June 2022, using a fleet consisting of a single Airbus A319. The company was launched with financial backing from various investors including Samherji and Norlandair. The company additionally had no immediate plans to acquire its own air operator's certificate, instead planning for its flights to be operated by a separate charter airline. During March 2022, the operating airline was revealed to be Hi Fly Malta, and Niceair subsequently began ticket sales for flights.

Following the launch of its first service to London Stansted on 3 June 2022, the company found it was not allowed to transport passengers on its first return flight from London back to Akureyri, as an air services treaty between Iceland and the United Kingdom that came into effect as part of Brexit did not allow for Hi Fly Malta to operate scheduled services between the two countries on behalf of Niceair. The company subsequently suspended its London Stansted services for at least the remainder of the month. Though since, services have not been resumed. This also led to the circumstance that the planned flights to Manchester did not proceed in October 2022 as previously planned.

Destinations 
, Niceair has offered scheduled services to the following destinations:

Fleet 
, Niceair has chartered the following aircraft under its brand:

References

External links
Official website 

Airlines of Iceland
Airlines established in 2022
Airlines for Europe
2022 establishments in Iceland
Icelandic brands